"The Hole in the Ground" is a comic song written by Myles Rudge and composed by Ted Dicks. When recorded by Bernard Cribbins and released by EMI on the Parlophone label in 1962, it was a number nine hit in the UK Singles Chart. It remains the highest charting and most successful of Cribbins' hit singles, staying on the chart for 13 weeks. The musical accompaniment was directed by Gordon Franks, and the producer was George Martin.

The song is about a dispute between a workman digging a hole and an officious busybody wearing a bowler hat.  This exemplifies British class conflict of the era and Cribbins switches between a working class Cockney accent, in which he drops his aitches, and a middle class accent for the gentleman in the bowler hat.

Reception
Noël Coward, who wrote many comic songs himself, chose the record as one of his Desert Island Discs. He said: "I think the only one I would never get sick of is "Hole in the Ground", because I could translate it into French as I walked up and down on the beach."

References

Novelty songs
1962 singles
Song recordings produced by George Martin
1962 songs
Bernard Cribbins songs
Songs written by Myles Rudge
Songs written by Ted Dicks
Parlophone singles